In mathematics, constructive nonstandard analysis is a version of Abraham Robinson's nonstandard analysis, developed by Moerdijk (1995), Palmgren (1998), Ruokolainen (2004).  Ruokolainen wrote: 

The possibility of constructivization of nonstandard analysis was studied by Palmgren (1997, 1998, 2001). The model of constructive nonstandard analysis studied there is an extension of Moerdijk’s (1995) model for constructive nonstandard arithmetic.

See also
Smooth infinitesimal analysis
John Lane Bell

References
Ieke Moerdijk, A model for intuitionistic nonstandard arithmetic, Annals of Pure and Applied Logic, vol. 73 (1995), pp. 37–51. 
 "Abstract: This paper provides an explicit description of a model for intuitionistic nonstandard arithmetic, which can be formalized in a constructive metatheory without the axiom of choice."
Erik Palmgren, Developments in Constructive Nonstandard Analysis, Bulletin of Symbolic Logic Volume 4, Number 3 (1998), 233–272.
 "Abstract: We develop a constructive version of nonstandard analysis, extending Bishop's constructive analysis with infinitesimal methods. ..."
Juha Ruokolainen 2004, Constructive Nonstandard Analysis Without Actual Infinity

Constructivism (mathematics)
Nonstandard analysis